Kamyshlov is a town in Sverdlovsk Oblast, Russia, located on the left bank of the Pyshma River (Ob's basin) at its confluence with the Kamyshlovka River. Population:

History
It was founded in 1668 Kamyshevsky ostrog. From 1687 it had been known as Kamyshlovskaya sloboda. Town status was granted to it in 1781.

Administrative and municipal status
Within the framework of the administrative divisions, Kamyshlov serves as the administrative center of Kamyshlovsky District, even though it is not a part of it. As an administrative division, it is incorporated separately as the Town of Kamyshlov—an administrative unit with the status equal to that of the districts. As a municipal division, the Town of Kamyshlov is incorporated as Kamyshlovsky Urban Okrug.

References

External links

Official website of Kamyshlov 
Kamyshlov Business Directory  

Cities and towns in Sverdlovsk Oblast
Kamyshlovsky Uyezd
Populated places established in 1668
1668 establishments in Russia